Dame Helena Shovelton, DBE, FRSA, Hon. FRCP (née Richards; born 28 May 1945) is former Chair of the UK National Association of Citizens Advice Bureaux, former Chair of the UK National Lottery Commission, and former Chief Executive of the British Lung Foundation.

Controversy
Before resigning from the National Lottery Commission, Shovelton ordered that the then-operator, Camelot, be excluded from bidding for the next seven-year Lottery licence. That decision eased the way for Richard Branson's rival, People's Lottery. However, a judge resurrected Camelot's bid in the High Court, ruling that the commission's dealings with Camelot had shown "a marked lack of even-handedness". He added "I have no doubt the commission was trying to be fair ...  [but added] there is in my judgment no escaping the conclusion that the procedure decided on by the commission was conspicuously unfair to Camelot."

See also the British Lung Foundation article for a controversy involving Shovelton regarding cancer risk from marijuana use.

Personal life
Helena Shovelton is a daughter of Denis Richards, OBE, the official historian of the Royal Air Force. She was educated at the North London Collegiate School and Regent Street Polytechnic; later she gained an MBA from Strathclyde University. She married Patrick Shovelton in 1968; he died in 2012.

Career
Her public career began with the Citizens' Advice Bureau in Tunbridge Wells. She went on to chair the organisation's national association. She also served as chairman of the Audit Commission, and as a member of the Monopolies and Mergers Commission and the Local Government Commission.

References

1945 births
Living people
People educated at North London Collegiate School
Alumni of the University of Strathclyde
Dames Commander of the Order of the British Empire
Fellows of the Royal College of Physicians

People from London